Elisa Lisete James Humbane, popularly known as Lizha James, is a Mozambican musician.

Awards and prizes

Won
 2005 - Prize TVZINE for Best Singer (Mozambique)
 2006 Channel O Music Video Awards - Best Female Video (4 all ya) 
 2007 Channel O Music Video Awards - Best R&B Video (Nuna Wa Mina)
 2007 Afro Music Channel Awards - Best African Song (Nuna Wa Mina)
 2008 Channel O Music Video Awards - Best Female Video (Nita Mukuma Kwini)
 2009 Channel O Music Video Awards - Best Southern African (Estilo Xakhale)

Nominations
 2012 Channel O Music Video Awards - Best Female Video ("Leva Boy" featuring Perola)
 2014 MTV Africa Music Awards - Best Lusophone
 2014 African Muzik Magazine Awards - Best Female Southern Africa

Sources 
MTV Base
Afro Music Channel
Lizha James: The Wedding of the Year (Portuguese)

References

21st-century Mozambican women singers
Living people
1982 births